Papinskaya is a rural locality (a village) in Nizhne-Vazhskoye Rural Settlement, Verkhovazhsky District, Vologda Oblast, Russia. The population was 15 as of 2002.

Geography 
Papinskaya is located 30 km southeast of Verkhovazhye (the district's administrative centre) by road. Trutnevskaya is the nearest rural locality.

References 

Rural localities in Verkhovazhsky District